Submarine Tracks & Fool's Gold is a compilation album of various artists made up of acts on Chiswick Records.

The critic and author Dave Thompson describes Submarine Tracks & Fool's Gold as a "driving" collection, rating it "eight out of ten". The album also receives a good review on the Allmusic website.

The album was followed up with the Long Shots, Dead Certs And Odds On Favourites (Chiswick Chartbusters Volume Two) compilation album in 1978.

Original track listing

Side one
 "The Keys To Your Heart" (3:36) by The 101ers
 "The Teenage Letter" (2:20) by The Count Bishops
 "The She's My Gal" (2:45) by The Gorillas
 "I'm Crying" (3:08) by Little Bob Story
 "The Train Train" (3:15) by The Count Bishops
 "The Gorilla Got Me" (3:07) by The Gorillas

Side two
 "Dirty Pictures" (2:50) by Radio Stars
 "The Gatecrasher" (2:55) by The Gorillas
 "Drip Drop" (2:14) by Rocky Sharpe & The Razors
 "Baby Don't Cry" (3:20) by Little Bob Story
 "The Route 66" (2:52) by The Count Bishops,
 "So Hard To Laugh" (2:24) by Rocky Sharpe & The Razors

References

Sampler albums
1977 compilation albums
Power pop compilation albums
Punk rock compilation albums
New wave compilation albums
Chiswick Records compilation albums